Todo Lo Que Soy-En Vivo is a live album by Fey, a Mexican pop singer. The album was recorded in Mexico City's National Auditorium after the success of her Fey: Primera Fila album.  Fey toured this show in various venues in Mexico, with many sold out dates and dates were added due to popular demand.  Before going in for an encore performance at the National Auditorium in April 2014, Fey had confirmed that would be the concert date she would record the show in a CD & DVD format.  The album was originally slated for a summer 2014 release, but was delayed due to Fey wanting to be involved in the details of the editing process.  On December 11, 2014, Fey confirmed via Twitter that the CD & DVD format would be released on December 17, 2014 and the digital version would go worldwide on December 24, 2014 along with the cover art.

With the exception of the album Faltan Lunas, Fey performs songs from all previous albums in the show.  The show's title was taken from a line in her song, Me Haces Tanta Falta, which also signified that her show would reflect Todo Lo Que Soy, or All That I Am.

CD Track listing
 Frio
 Te Pertenezco
 Diselo Con Flores
 Gatos en el Balcón
 Desmargaritando el Corazón
 Me Enamoro De Ti
 Tierna La Noche
 Cielo Liquido
 Lentamente
 Se Lo Que Vendra
 Dressing to Kill
 La Noche Se Mueve
 Azucar Amargo
 Media Naranja
Muevelo

DVD Track listing
 Frio
 Te Pertenezco
 Diselo Con Flores
 Gatos en el Balcón
 Desmargaritando el Corazón
Me Haces Tanta Falta
 Me Enamoro De Ti
 Tierna La Noche
 Cielo Liquido
 Lentamente
 Se Lo Que Vendra
 Dressing to Kill
 La Noche Se Mueve
 Azucar Amargo
 Media Naranja
Muevelo

Note: Though performed at the shows, Barco a Venus, Ni Tu Ni Nadie, Canela, and Subidon were not added to neither the CD nor DVD track listings.

Charts

Tour

References

2014 live albums
Fey (singer) live albums
Spanish-language live albums
Albums recorded at the Auditorio Nacional (Mexico)